Pelle or Pellè is the surname of the following people
Anikó Pelle (born 1978), Hungarian water polo player
Anthony Pelle (born 1972), American basketball player
Antonio Pelle (1932–2009), Italian mafiosi 
Giuseppe Pelle (born 1960), Italian mafiosi, son of Antonio
 Graziano Pellè (born 1985), Italian football player
István Pelle (1907–1986), Hungarian gymnast
Jon Pelle (born 1986), American ice hockey player
Maurice Pellé (1863–1924), French general
Nathan Pelle, American film and television actor 
Salvatore Pelle (born 1957), Italian mafiosi, son of Antonio
Sebastiano Pelle (born 1954), Italian mafiosi, nephew of Antonio

See also
Pele (name), given name and surname
Pell, surname